Los Angeles is a census-designated place (CDP) in Willacy County, Texas, United States. The population was 121 at the 2010 census.
Prior to the 2010 census, the CDP was known as Los Angeles Subdivision.

Geography
Los Angeles is located at  (26.494811, -97.786310).

According to the United States Census Bureau, the CDP has a total area of 0.2 square mile (0.4 km2), all land.

Demographics
As of the census of 2000, there were 86 people, 23 households, and 20 families residing in the CDP. The population density was 520.5 people per square mile (195.3/km2). There were 34 housing units at an average density of 205.8/sq mi (77.2/km2). The racial makeup of the CDP was 43.02% White, 56.98% from other races. Hispanic or Latino of any race were 94.19% of the population.

There were 23 households, out of which 65.2% had children under the age of 18 living with them, 52.2% were married couples living together, 26.1% had a female householder with no husband present, and 8.7% were non-families. 8.7% of all households were made up of individuals, and 4.3% had someone living alone who was 65 years of age or older. The average household size was 3.74 and the average family size was 3.95.

In the CDP, the population was spread out, with 44.2% under the age of 18, 16.3% from 18 to 24, 27.9% from 25 to 44, 7.0% from 45 to 64, and 4.7% who were 65 years of age or older. The median age was 22 years. For every 100 females, there were 100.0 males. For every 100 females age 18 and over, there were 108.7 males.

The median income for a household in the CDP was $4,500, and the median income for a family was $3,250. Males had a median income of $8,750 versus $0 for females. The per capita income for the CDP was $2,701. There were 100.0% of families and 100.0% of the population living below the poverty line, including 100.0% of under 18 and none of those over 65.

Education
Los Angeles is a part of the Raymondville Independent School District.

In addition, South Texas Independent School District operates magnet schools that serve the community.

References

Census-designated places in Texas
Census-designated places in Willacy County, Texas